Vlasov or Vlasoff (masculine) is a common Russian surname formed from the first name Vlas or from the Greek  Βλάσιος (Blaise) meaning simple. There is also a version that the family name can come  from the Slavonic vlas meaning hair. 
According to some versions the surname correlates to the Slavonic Veles (god).
The feminine form of the surname is Vlasova.
The surname is shared by:
Aleksandr Vlasov (disambiguation)
Andrey Vlasov (1901–1946), Russian general of Red Army who later led Russian Liberation Army against U.S.S.R.
Andrey Vlasov (footballer, born 1965), Russian football player
Anatoly Vlasov (1908–1975), Soviet physicist, author of the Vlasov equation and McKean–Vlasov process
Dmitri Vlasov (born 1973), Russian football player
Dmitry Vlasov (born 1982), Russian tennis player
Evgenia Vlasova (born 1978), Ukrainian singer-songwriter
Igor Vlasov (born 1980), Russian musician and music producer
Ilia Vlasov (born 1995), Russian volleyball player
Ivan Vlasov (1903–1969), Soviet administrator, nominal head of state of Russian Federation
Maxim Vlasov (born 1986), Russian boxer
Nikolai Vlasov (1916–1945), flying ace and leader of prisoner uprising in the Mauthausen concentration camp
Oleg Vlasov (born 1984), Russian footballer
Oleh Vlasov (born 2002), Ukrainian footballer
Olesia Vlasova (born 1974), Ukrainian actress
Peter Vladimirov, pen name of Pyotr Vlasov (1905–1953), Soviet diplomat and journalist, father of Yury Vlasov
Pavel Vlasov (born 1960), merited test pilot of the Russian Federation
Pyotr Vlasov, Russian ambassador to Persia in 1902–1903
Simon Vlasov (born 1981), Russian speedway rider
Tatiana Vlasova (born 1977), Russian ski-orienteer
Vadim Vlasov (born 1980), Russian football player
Valentin Vlasov (1946–2020), Russian politician and diplomat
Veronika Vlasova (born 1966), Russian politician
Viktor Vlasov (disambiguation)
Vladimir Vlasov (1902–1986), Russian composer and conductor
Yuliya Vlasova (born 1967), Russian short track speed skater
Yuri Vlasov

References

Russian-language surnames